The Kapan mine is one of the largest gold mines in the Armenia. The mine is located in the south-east of the country in Syunik Province. The mine has estimated reserves of 5.15 million oz of gold and 95.6 million oz of silver. The mine also has ore reserves amounting to 335.8 million tonnes grading 0.11% copper and 0.41% zinc.

Mine is operated by “Kapan Mining and Processing Enterprise” CJSC.

Chaarat Gold Holdings Limited acquired 100% of shares of “Kapan Mining and Processing Enterprise” CJSC for US$55M from a company listed on the same stock exchange which is a subsidiary of Russian Polymetal Group.

References 

Gold mines in Armenia
Copper mines in Armenia
Zinc mines in Armenia
Buildings and structures in Syunik Province
Geography of Syunik Province
Gold mines in the Soviet Union